Marco Anastasio known as Anastasio (born 13 May 1997) is an Italian rapper and singer. He was born in Meta, Campania, a town near Naples. He is best known for winning the twelfth season of the Italian talent show X Factor in 2018. His debut single, "La fine del mondo", was released on 23 November 2018 and topped the charts in Italy.

Biography

Early life 
Marco Anastasio was born in 1997 in Meta, Campania.

2015-2018: Career beginnings 
He published his first EP Disciplina sperimentale produced by Gigi Emme in 2015 and he also uploaded some singles on his YouTube channel using the pseudonym Nasta. On 20 March 2018 he published the song "Come Maurizio Sarri" dedicated to Maurizio Sarri the former coach of the professional football club S.S.C. Napoli. The song was successful, especially among football fans.

2018–2020: X Factor Italia, Sanremo 2020 and first album 
He won the twelfth edition of the Italian version of the X Factor in December 2018. On 23 November 2018 his debut single "La fine del mondo" was released and it topped the charts in Italy winning a Gold Certification. On 14 December 2018 his EP La fine del mondo was released on Spotify.

On 8 February 2019 he appeared as a musical guest during the fourth show of the 69th Sanremo Music Festival, performing the song "Correre", which followed a monologue by actor and presenter Claudio Bisio. The song was released as a digital single on 9 February 2019.

He competed at the Sanremo Music Festival 2020 with the song "Rosso di rabbia". On 7 February 2020, he released his debut album Atto zero.

Discography

Studio albums

Extended plays

Singles

References

External links

Italian pop singers
Living people
1997 births
The X Factor winners
X Factor (Italian TV series) contestants
Musicians from Naples
21st-century Italian  male singers